Theodoros Bozidis (born ) is a retired Greek male volleyball player. He was part of the Greece men's national volleyball team at the 2002 FIVB Volleyball Men's World Championship in Argentina.

Clubs
 Iraklis Thessaloniki (2002)

References

External links
 profile, club career, info at greekvolley.gr (in Greek)

1973 births
Living people
Greek men's volleyball players
Olympiacos S.C. players
Iraklis V.C. players
A.C. Orestias players
PAOK V.C. players
Place of birth missing (living people)
Volleyball players from Orestiada